Skomer Marine Conservation Zone is an underwater marine nature reserve located off the coast of Pembrokeshire in Wales. The nature reserve completely surrounds the islands of Skomer and Middleholm, and encompasses the mainland coastline around the end of the Marloes peninsula, including the small bay of Martin's Haven.

The sea bed and rocky shelves of the island are teeming with life. Common eelgrass, Zostera marina, one of the very few plants that flower underwater, grows on beds of sand and gravel in sheltered waters and its long, grass-like leaves form underwater lawns that provide food and shelter for other plants and animals. Species of lobsters, crabs and other crustaceans abound, and grey seals give birth on the coast in October and November.

History
Although the island of Skomer had long been a protected area, the Marine Nature Reserve was not established until 1990.  It was one of only three Marine Nature Reserves in United Kingdom. Since the introduction of Marine Conservation Zones in 2013, there has been a larger network of marine reserves in the UK. Skomer itself was reclassified as a Marine Conservation Zone in December 2014.

Related protected area
In 2004 Pembrokeshire Marine SAC was designated. The SAC is much larger than the nature reserve at 132,174 ha.

See also
Skomer

References

External links 
Photos of Skomer Marine Nature Reserve and surrounding area on geograph

Marine reserves of Wales
National nature reserves in Wales
Protected areas established in 1990
1990 establishments in Wales